Viḷḷatexil is one of 54 parishes (administrative divisions) in Cangas del Narcea, a municipality within the province and autonomous community of Asturias, in northern Spain.

Towns 
 Las Mestas
 Morzóu
 Viḷḷatexil

Other places 
 El Barriu
 Las Rapegueras
 El Reboḷḷu

References

Parishes in Cangas del Narcea